James Hudson III (born May 13, 1999) is an American football offensive tackle for the Cleveland Browns of the National Football League (NFL). Hudson played college football at Michigan and Cincinnati.

College career
Hudson began his collegiate career at Michigan and redshirted his true freshman year as he changed positions from defensive line to offensive tackle. Hudson appeared in three games as a redshirt freshman. Hudson opted to leave the program at the end of the season and chose to transfer to Cincinnati.

Hudson sat out the regular season of his first year with the Bearcats per NCAA transfer rules after a waiver to play immediately was denied. Hudson started in the 2020 Birmingham Bowl following the end of the regular season. As a redshirt junior, Hudson started all 11 of Cincinnati's games and was named first-team All-American Athletic Conference. Following his lone season as a starter, he announced he would be forgoing his remaining eligibility and enter the 2021 NFL Draft.

Professional career

On May 1, 2021, Hudson was selected by the Cleveland Browns with the 110th overall pick in the 2021 NFL Draft. On May 18, 2021, Hudson signed his four-year rookie contract with Cleveland, worth $4.16 million.

References

External links
 Cincinnati profile
 Michigan profile

1999 births
Living people
American football offensive tackles
Cincinnati Bearcats football players
Cleveland Browns players
Michigan Wolverines football players
Sportspeople from Toledo, Ohio
Players of American football from Ohio